The 1890 Cork Senior Hurling Championship was the fourth staging of the Cork Senior Hurling Championship since its establishment by the Cork County Board in 1887. The draw for the opening round fixtures took place on 18 February 1890. The championship began on 9 March 1890 and ended on 13 July 1890.

Blackrock were the defending champions.

On 13 July 1890, Aghabullogue won the championship following a 7-3 to 1-1 defeat of Aghada in the final. This remains their only championship title.

Results

Final

Championship statistics

Miscellaneous

 Following their county championship success, Aghabullogue represent Cork in the inter-county championship. They become the first Cork team to win the All-Ireland title.
 Aghabullogue are the first non city club to win the title.

References

Cork Senior Hurling Championship
Cork Senior Hurling Championship